The Carina Nebula or Eta Carinae Nebula (catalogued as NGC 3372; also known as the Great Carina Nebula) is a large, complex area of bright and dark nebulosity in the constellation Carina, located in the Carina–Sagittarius Arm of the Milky Way galaxy.

The nebula is one of the largest diffuse nebulae in our skies. Although it is four times as large as and even brighter than the famous Orion Nebula, the Carina Nebula is much less well known due to its location in the southern sky. It was discovered by Nicolas-Louis de Lacaille in 1752 from the Cape of Good Hope.

The Carina Nebula was selected as one of five cosmic objects observed by the James Webb Space Telescope, as part of the release of its first official science images.  A detailed image was made of an early star-forming region of NGC 3324 known as the Cosmic Cliffs.

Discovery and basic information
Nicolas-Louis de Lacaille discovered the nebula on 25 January 1752. Its dimensions are 120×120 arcminutes centered on the coordinates of right ascension  and declination .

Objects within the Carina Nebula

Eta Carinae

Eta Carinae is a highly luminous hypergiant star. Estimates of its mass range from 100 to 150 times the mass of the Sun, and its luminosity is about four million times that of the Sun.

This object is currently the most massive star that can be studied in great detail, because of its location and size. Several other known stars may be more luminous and more massive, but data on them is far less robust. (Caveat: Since examples such as the Pistol Star have been demoted by improved data, one should be skeptical of most available lists of "most massive stars". In 2006, Eta Carinae still had the highest confirmed luminosity, based on data across a broad range of wavelengths.) Stars with more than 80 times the mass of the Sun produce more than a million times as much light as the Sun. They are quite rare—only a few dozen in a galaxy as big as ours—and they flirt with disaster near the Eddington limit, i.e., the outward pressure of their radiation is almost strong enough to counteract gravity. Stars that are more than 120 solar masses exceed the theoretical Eddington limit, and their gravity is barely strong enough to hold in its radiation and gas, resulting in a possible supernova or hypernova in the near future.

Eta Carinae's effects on the nebula can be seen directly. Dark globules and some other less visible objects have tails pointing directly away from the massive star. The entire nebula would have looked very different before the Great Eruption in the 1840s surrounded Eta Carinae with dust, drastically reducing the amount of ultraviolet light it put into the nebula.

Homunculus Nebula

Within the large bright nebula is a much smaller feature, immediately surrounding Eta Carinae itself, known as the Homunculus Nebula (from Latin meaning Little Man). It is believed to have been ejected in an enormous outburst in 1841 which briefly made Eta Carinae the second-brightest star in the sky.

The Homunculus Nebula is a small H II region, with gas shocked into ionized and excited states. It also absorbs much of the light from the extremely luminous central stellar system and re-radiates it as infrared (IR). It is the brightest object in the sky at mid-IR wavelengths.

The distance to the Homunculus can be derived from its observed angular dimensions and calculated linear size, assuming it is axially symmetric. The largest radius of the bipolar lobes in this model is about 22,000 AU, and the axis is oriented 41° from the line of sight, or 49° relative to the plane of the sky, which means it is seen from Earth slightly more "end on" than "side on".

Keyhole Nebula

The Keyhole, or Keyhole Nebula, is a small dark cloud of cold molecules and dust within the Carina Nebula, containing bright filaments of hot, fluorescing gas, silhouetted against the much brighter background nebula. John Herschel used the term "lemniscate-oval vacuity" when first describing it, and subsequently referred to it simply as the "oval vacuity". The term lemniscate continued to be used to describe this portion of the nebula until popular astronomy writer Emma Converse described the shape of the nebula as "resembling a keyhole" in an 1873 Appleton's Journal article. The name Keyhole Nebula then came into common use, sometimes for the Keyhole itself, sometimes to describe the whole of the Carina Nebula (signifying "the nebula that contains the Keyhole").

Its appearance has changed significantly since it was first observed, possibly due to changes in the ionizing radiation from Eta Carinae. The Keyhole does not have its own NGC designation. It is sometimes erroneously called NGC 3324, but that catalogue designation refers to a reflection and emission nebula just northwest of the Carina Nebula (or to its embedded star cluster).

Defiant Finger

A small Bok globule in the Keyhole Nebula (at RA 10h44m30s, Dec −59°40') has been photographed by the Hubble Space Telescope and is nicknamed the "Carina Defiant Finger" due to its shape. In Hubble images, light can be seen radiating off the edges of the globule; this is especially visible in the southern tip, where the "finger" is. It is thought that the Defiant Finger is being ionized by the bright Wolf–Rayet star WR 25, and/or Trumpler 16-244, a bright blue supergiant. It has a mass of at least , and stars may be forming within it. Like other interstellar clouds under intense radiation, the Defiant Finger will eventually be completely evaporated; for this cloud the time frame is predicted to be 200,000 to 1,000,000 years.

Trumpler 14

It is one of the main clusters of the  stellar association, which is the largest association in the Carina Nebula.

Trumpler 15

Trumpler 15 is a star cluster on the north-east edge of the Carina Nebula. Early studies disagreed about the distance, but astrometric measurements by the Gaia mission have confirmed that it is the same distance as the rest of Carina OB1.

Trumpler 16

The star Eta Carinae is part of this cluster.

Mystic Mountain

Mystic Mountain is the term for a dust–gas pillar in the Carina Nebula, a photo of which was taken by Hubble Space Telescope on its 20th anniversary. The area was observed by Hubble's Wide Field Camera 3 on 1–2 February 2010. The pillar measures  in height; nascent stars inside the pillar fire off gas jets that stream from towering “peaks”.

WR 22

WR 22 is an eclipsing binary.

WR 25

WR 25 is a binary system in the central portion of the Carina Nebula, a member of the  cluster. The primary is a Wolf–Rayet star, possibly the most luminous star in the galaxy. The secondary is hard to detect but thought to be a luminous OB star.

HD 93129

HD 93129 is a triple star system of O-class stars in Carina.

HD 93129 A has been resolved into two components. The spectrum is dominated by the brighter component, although the secondary is only 0.9 magnitudes fainter.  is an O2 supergiant and Ab is an O3.5 main sequence star. Their separation has decreased from 55 milliarcseconds in 2004 to only 27 mas in 2013, but an accurate orbit is not available.

HD 93129 B is an O3.5 main-sequence star 3 arcseconds away from the closer pair.

HD 93250

HD 93250 is one of the brightest stars in the region of the Carina Nebula.

HD 93250 is known to be a binary star, however, individual spectra of the two components have never been observed but are thought to be very similar. The spectral type of  has variously been given as O5, O6/7, O4, and O3. It has sometimes been classified as a main sequence star and sometimes as a giant star. The Galactic O-Star Spectroscopic Survey has used it as the standard star for the newly created O4 subgiant spectral type.

HD 93205

HD 93205 is a binary system of two large stars.

The more massive member of the pair is an O3.5 main sequence star. The spectrum shows some ionized nitrogen and helium emission lines, indicating some mixing of fusion products to the surface and a strong stellar wind. This is somewhat lower than expected from evolutionary modelling of a star with its observed parameters.

Catalogued open clusters in Carina Nebula
, there are eight known open clusters in the Carina Nebula:
Bochum 10 (Bo 10)
Bochum 11 (Bo 11)
Collinder 228 (Cr 228)
Collinder 232 (Cr 232)
Collinder 234 (Cr 234)
Trumpler 14 (Tr 14, Cr 230)
Trumpler 15 (Tr 15, Cr 231)
Trumpler 16 (Tr 16, Cr 233)

Annotated map

Gallery

See also
Tarantula Nebula

References

External links

Carina Nebula at SEDS.org
Carina Nebula at Atlas of the Universe
Carina Nebula at Constellation Guide

 
Carina (constellation)
Carina–Sagittarius Arm
H II regions
3372
092
Articles containing video clips
17520125
Star-forming regions